Martin Tomášek (born September 2, 1978) is a Czech professional ice hockey centre who plays for HC Kopřivnice of the 2nd Czech Republic Hockey League.

Tomášek played ten seasons in the Czech Extraliga for HC Vítkovice, playing in 399 regular season games for the team from 1997 to 2002 and again from 2003 to 2008. He also played in the Russian Superleague for HC Sibir Novosibirsk, the Tipsport Liga for HK Poprad and MHk 32 Liptovský Mikuláš and the Ligue Magnus for Gothiques d'Amiens

Tomásek played in the 1998 World Junior Ice Hockey Championships for the Czech Republic.

References

External links

1978 births
Living people
Bisons de Neuilly-sur-Marne players
Czech ice hockey centres
VEU Feldkirch players
Gothiques d'Amiens players
MHk 32 Liptovský Mikuláš players
People from Bílovec
HK Poprad players
Red Deer Rebels players
HC Sibir Novosibirsk players
HC Slezan Opava players
HC Vítkovice players
Sportspeople from the Moravian-Silesian Region
Czech expatriate ice hockey players in Canada
Czech expatriate ice hockey players in Slovakia
Czech expatriate ice hockey players in Russia
Czech expatriate sportspeople in Austria
Czech expatriate sportspeople in France
Expatriate ice hockey players in Austria
Expatriate ice hockey players in France